Drew University is a private university in Madison, New Jersey. Drew has been nicknamed the "University in the Forest" because of its wooded  campus. As of fall 2020, more than 2,200 students were pursuing degrees at the university's three schools.

In 1867, financier and railroad tycoon Daniel Drew purchased an estate in Madison to establish a theological seminary to train candidates for Methodist ministry. The seminary later expanded to offer an undergraduate liberal arts curriculum in 1928 and graduate studies in 1955. The College of Liberal Arts, serving more than 1,600 undergraduate students, offers strong concentrations in the natural sciences, social sciences, languages and literatures, humanities and the arts, and in several interdisciplinary and multidisciplinary fields. The Drew Theological School, the third-oldest of thirteen Methodist seminaries affiliated with the United Methodist Church, currently enrolls more than 350 students preparing for careers in the ministry and the academic study of theology.

The Caspersen School of Graduate Studies, enrolling more than 250 graduate students, offers master's and doctoral degrees in a variety of specialized and interdisciplinary fields.

While affiliated with the Methodist faith, Drew University makes no religious demands of its students. Although many of the Theological School's students and faculty are Methodists, students of all faiths are admitted to any program within the university. The United Methodist Church's General Commission on Archives and History is located on campus; the commission maintains an archive of Methodist records and artifacts from the 19th century to the present.

Campus 

Known as "the Rose City" because of its rose-cultivating industry in the nineteenth century, Madison is an affluent commuter town in New Jersey's Morris County. It is connected with the northern section of the state and Midtown Manhattan through the NJ Transit's Morris & Essex Lines. The university hosts the Shakespeare Theatre of New Jersey, an independent professional theatre company.

The university sits on the former estate of William Gibbons (1794–1852), who owned the New York–New Jersey steamboat business that became famous from the Thomas Gibbons v. Ogden case, and who pieced together a  estate in Madison, New Jersey in 1832. He named his holdings "The Forest," which gives Drew its nickname of the "University in the Forest". The following year, Gibbons commissioned the design and construction of a Greek revival antebellum-style residence that was completed in 1836. In 1867, financier and railroad tycoon Daniel Drew (1797–1879) purchased Gibbons' estate from his descendants for $140,000. Drew, a devout Methodist, donated the estate to the church to establish a Methodist theological seminary. The estate's mansion would be renamed "Mead Hall" in honor of Drew's wife, Roxanna Mead.

Several motion pictures, TV productions, and music videos have used Drew University as a filming location. The campus has been featured in films such as So Fine (1981), Deconstructing Harry (1997), The Family Stone (2005), Spinning into Butter (2008), The Incredible Hulk (2008); and in television programs such as The Sopranos and Friday Night Lights.

Drew's academic buildings feature a mix of Greek Revival, Collegiate Gothic, and neoclassical architecture on a  campus that is a serene, wooded oasis in the middle of a bustling suburban town. The campus features the Drew Forest Preserve, an  expanse that was recently restored with the planting of 1,100 native trees and shrubs by the university community and volunteer assistance from pharmaceutical manufacturer Pfizer (a large, local employer), the US Fish and Wildlife Service, the New Jersey Audubon Society. The university's campus also features the Florence and Robert Zuck Arboretum, named for two botany faculty members, containing a mixture of native and non-native trees, plants and two small glacial ponds supporting populations of turtles, goldfish, catfish, and muskrats, and various species of birds including migratory fowl such as Canada geese, ducks, and herons.

The preserve and arboretum both provide a natural laboratory for the instruction of students in the study of biology and life sciences and for research, but is also open to the public by appointment. According to the New Jersey chapter of the Audubon Society, the arboretum and forest preserve is "important for groundwater recharge and runoff reduction within the Passaic River watershed and the Buried Valley Aquifer System".

History

From estate to seminary (1832–1928) 
In 1866, Daniel Drew approached church leaders during the Methodist Centenary Celebration with an offer to build, equip, and endow a theological seminary near New York City. Drew asked that his pastor, John McClintock (1814–1870), be appointed to lead the seminary as its first president. Instruction began under the direction of McClintock as both president and professor of practical theology after the first students were admitted in 1867. Drew is the third-oldest of thirteen Methodist seminaries affiliated with the United Methodist Church.

Drew offered professional training for candidates to the ministry augmented by "an opportunity for a broad culture through the study of the humanities." The seminary attracted a faculty that made influential contributions to Methodist theology and biblical scholarship, including James Strong (1822–1894), a professor of exegetical theology, who collaborated with McClintock on the ten-volume Cyclopaedia of Biblical, Theological, and Ecclesiastical Literature (1867–1881), and researched, compiled, and published Strong's Exhaustive Concordance of the Bible (1890) during his tenure at the seminary. Writings on early church theology and Christian practice were translated into Chinese for use by foreign missions.

As a liberal arts college (1928–1990) 

Throughout the nineteenth and early twentieth centuries, Drew Theological Seminary educated and trained hundreds of Methodist ministers. It began to expand its role with the addition of a course of study for women in 1920 when it established a "College of Missions." This course would be renamed the "College of Religious Education and Missions" in 1929 but was short-lived.

In 1928, Drew Theological Seminary accepted a gift of $1.5 million from brothers Arthur J. Baldwin (1868–1939) and Leonard D. Baldwin (1866–1933) to establish an undergraduate liberal arts college. The Baldwins were successful attorneys who were raised on a farm in Cortland, New York. Both brothers attended Cornell University. They established a law firm with former New Jersey governor John Griggs spanning "varied interests in lumbering, manufacturing, transportation, and other enterprises that ranged from owning the Grosvenor Hotel in New York City to Arthur's legal counseling for the rising McGraw-Hill publishing empire." The Baldwins became acquainted with the seminary's president, Ezra Squier Tipple, who "welcomed the brothers to his prominent New York City Methodist Church when they came to Manhattan." Leonard Baldwin eventually became a trustee of the seminary in 1919. The donation originally consisted of $500,000 to build a college building, and $1,000,000 in the form of Great Atlantic & Pacific Tea Company (A&P) stock. However, the Baldwins exchanged the stock with a gift of cash in October 1928.

In their modesty and in recognition of their sibling affection, the Baldwins asked that it be named "Brothers College." The theological seminary then changed its name to "Drew University" to reflect its expanded role. Brothers College, later renamed as the "College of Liberal Arts", opened in September 1928 with its first class of 12 students. Brothers College would incorporate the women's program and become coeducational in 1942 during World War II when school officials recognized that the military draft and war effort would reduce the all-male student body. Drew offered admission to United States Navy personnel through the V-12 Navy College Training Program. Drew was one of 131 colleges and universities nationally that took part in the program which offered students a path to a naval officers' commission.

Drew began offering graduate-level education in 1912. The university expanded its graduate education programs, focusing on religious studies and establishing the Graduate School, a third of Drew's degree-granting entities, in 1955, under the leadership of the university's seventh president, Fred Holloway. Holloway also delivered on goals set during previous administrations, overseeing the renovation and rebuilding of the Drew campus, including the Baldwin Gymnasium and several dormitories. Four years later, it would expand the curriculum into other areas of the humanities. The Graduate School was renamed as the "Caspersen School of Graduate Studies" after a pledge of $5,000,000 in 1999 by financier Finn M. W. Caspersen (1941–2009) and his wife (and Drew alumna) Barbara Morris Caspersen (1945-2017).

With financial assistance from the Mellon Foundation, the college established a freshman seminar program during the 1970s, which allows first-year students to participate, with faculty who also serve as their academic advisers, in intensive study of a topic of hopefully mutual interest. Interdisciplinary study became a focus of the curriculum as well, with the creation of majors in neuroscience and minors in such fields as American studies and museology, dance, and writing.

In 1984, psychology professors Philip Jensen and Richard Detweiler led an effort to provide a personal computer and application software to all incoming freshman, a program referred to as the "Computer Initiative". Drew was the first liberal arts college to have such a requirement. The Computer Initiative differentiated Drew from other liberal arts colleges, and continued until 2012, by which time most entering students had their own computers or wished to select their own model.

Drew University today (1990–present) 

After serving two terms as New Jersey's 48th governor, Thomas Kean (born 1935) was appointed as Drew's tenth president in 1990. He would serve for 15 years before retiring in 2005. As president, Kean raised Drew's profile, overseeing fundraising efforts that tripled the size of the university's endowment, adding new faculty in African, Asian, Russian, and Middle Eastern studies, significantly increased opportunities for students to study abroad, increased applications from prospective students, and committed more than $60 million to construction of new buildings and renovation of older buildings—principally student residence halls.

After Kean's retirement, the trustees selected Robert Weisbuch, former president of the Woodrow Wilson National Fellowship Foundation, as Drew's eleventh president in 2005. He served for seven years, and stepped down in June 2012. Under Weisbuch's direction, Drew became SAT-optional. From 2006 to 2013, applicants were allowed to submit a graded high school essay instead of SAT or ACT scores. In 2013, the university reinstated the SAT (or ACT) as an admission requirement, and changed course two years later in 2015, making it optional once again.

MaryAnn Baenninger became the president of Drew University in July 2014 after serving 10 years as the president of the College of Saint Benedict. She succeeded Vivian A. Bull, a former economics professor and associate dean of the college at Drew and former president of Linfield College, who served as Drew's interim president from 2012 to 2014.

The 2015 Nobel Prize in Physiology or Medicine was shared by William Campbell, a research fellow at Drew University, for his work developing a drug that treats parasitic diseases.

Undergraduate tuition, room and board for the 2017–2018 academic year was $62,000 (excluding books, personal expenditures, and health insurance), making Drew among the most expensive private universities in New Jersey. In September 2017, the school announced that it was cutting the list price of its tuition for the 2018–2019 school year by 20%, from $48,300 to $36,600, as part of an effort to make the school more appealing to prospective students who had been deterred by the sticker price, which had been one of the state's highest.

In May 2020, it was announced by the school's board of trustees that President Baenninger would step down at the conclusion of her contract on July 31, 2020. In July, the school's search committee announced the appointment of Thomas J. Schwarz as interim president, beginning on August 1, 2020. Schwarz had previously served as president of Purchase College, SUNY, from 2002 to 2019 and was named President Emeritus of Purchase College shortly following his retirement. On February 8, 2023 the University announced the appointment of its fifteenth president, Hilary L. Link, former president of Allegheny College.

Academics

Accreditation and affiliations 
Drew University is accredited by the Commission on Higher Education of the Middle States Association of Colleges and Schools with approval granted to offer undergraduate and graduate degree programs and professional or post-graduate certificates. Drew was first accredited in 1932 and its accreditation was reaffirmed after a recent review concluded in 2016. Since 1938, the theological seminary at Drew has been accredited by the Commission on Accrediting of the Association of Theological Schools in the United States and Canada. Drew's MAT program is accredited by the Council for Accreditation of Educator Preparation.

All of the university's programs are approved and accredited by the General Board of Higher Education and Ministry and the University Senate of the United Methodist Church. Drew is one of 119 institutions that are members of the National Association of Schools and Colleges of The United Methodist Church (NASCUMC). Drew is also a member of the American Council on Education, Council of Graduate Schools, Association of American Colleges and Universities, and the Council for Advancement and Support of Education.

Undergraduate programs 

Drew University offers programs leading to the traditional undergraduate degree of Bachelor of Arts (BA) and Bachelor of Science (BS) through its College of Liberal Arts. Traditional core liberal arts courses are required of Drew students within a general education curriculum that allows them to shape an individual academic program. Drew's programs emphasize depth, independent research, experiential learning, and collaborative teaming. A declared minor is required in the general education program, and students choose from structured disciplinary and interdisciplinary offerings, or may design a minor course of study, subject to faculty approval. The university provides undergraduate major concentrations in 50 academic areas and an additional 20 minor concentrations. The Princeton Review has consistently ranked Drew as having a top 20 theatre program in the United States since 2011. Its most popular undergraduate majors, based on 2021 graduates, were:
Business Administration and Management (43)
Psychology (37)
Biology/Biological Sciences (36)
Communication and Media Studies (26)
Economics (23)
Fine/Studio Arts (21)
Computer Science (21)

Below is a list of key programs available to undergraduate students:
 Semester on Wall Street: an 8-credit program where 20 students attend classes twice a week in New York City at St. John's University, located in the Financial District. Students have guest lecturers from the various banks, organizations, and financial agencies.
 Semester on the United Nations: an 8-credit program where 20 students attend classes twice a week in New York City in the Church Center, directly across from UN Headquarters. Students have guest lecturers from the UN Secretariat and NGOs, and attend meetings of the UN General Assembly.
 Research Institute for Scientists Emeriti (RISE): selected students engage in research under the supervision of retired industrial scientists.
 Drew Summer Science Institute: an on-campus summer program that pairs approximately 15 Drew students with faculty mentors for an intensive experience working full-time on a research project.
 New York Semester on Contemporary Art: an 8-credit program where students meet weekly to discuss timely issues, and then visit New York City art museums two days a week.
 London Semester: a 16-credit program where students explore political and social change in Great Britain.

Graduate programs 
Graduate education has taken place at Drew University since 1912. Initially, graduate education was limited to theology and was conducted through the Theological School. In 1955, the Graduate School was established to take responsibility for the academic (i.e., non-ministerial) study of religion at the graduate level and allow for the development of new graduate programs. In 1999, in exchange for a private donation made by Barbara and Finn Caspersen, the school was renamed the Caspersen School of Graduate Studies.

In 2006, the Graduate Division of Religion (GDR), which includes programs in biblical studies and early Christianity, historical studies, religion & society, and theological & philosophical studies, was moved from the Graduate School to the Theological School. The transition was made to reflect current trends in the academic study of religion. In 2006, the school created a Master of Arts in Teaching (MAT) program, In recent years, the school has also added Master of Education, Master of Finance, and data analytics degrees.

As of 2019, the Graduate School offered 10-degree programs, including an earned Doctor of Letters degree.
In February 2022 it was announced that the university would halt admissions to their PhD program in History & Culture.

Theological degree programs 

Drew Theological School admitted its first students in 1867. Until the 1950s, the school was known as the Drew Theological Seminary, and most students sought a Bachelor of Divinity (B.Div.) degree, which was considered the standard for becoming a minister in an established church. Occasionally, the seminary did issue other degrees, such a Master of Arts (MA) or a Doctor of Theology (Th.D.) to students engaged in the graduate study of religion. Starting in 1920 women were admitted as students, and most notably Olive Winchester was issued a Doctor of Theology in 1925, and became the first female ordained minister in Great Britain.

The school is often noted for its strong ties to Korean Methodism. The Rev. Henry Appenzeller, a graduate of the Theological School, became the first Christian missionary to Korea. He worked to establish the Korean Methodist Church, schools and universities, and he translated the Bible into Korean. Henry Appenzeller maintained relationships with members of the Drew community following his graduation in the year 1885. As a result of his work and his connection to Drew, in 2016 members of the Chungdong First Methodist Church in Seoul, South Korea, started in 1887 by Appenzeller, visited Drew and donated a bronze bust of their patron, located outside the Theological School building. the Theological School's matriculating class includes many students from South Korea.

One of the 13 official seminaries of the United Methodist Church, the Theological School prepares those pursuing ministry in the United Methodist Church. The student body also includes students preparing for ministry in other Christian denominations, and those from other faith communities.

As of 2019, the Theological School offers six different degree programs.  In October 2018, the school launched the "Drew Social Justice Leadership Project" which allows students, partners and professors to express their thoughts, and share their experience regarding social justice issues in an accessible way.

Rose Memorial Library and Methodist Archives 
Built in 1938 with funds donated by Lenox S. Rose, the Rose Memorial Library houses the university's library collections offering 558,000 bound volumes, more than 378,000 microforms, 10,000 periodical titles in electronic database subscriptions, and about 2,700 periodical subscriptions in paper form. The facility also includes a media resource center and learning center. The library has been designated a selective depository for U.S. government publications in accordance with the Federal Depository Library Program. Drew also maintains collections of official documents from the United Nations and the state of New Jersey. There are over 400,000 documents in the collection.

Drew University houses the United Methodist Archives and History Center administered by the United Methodist Commission on Archives and History. This collection is among the most comprehensive collections of Methodist books, documents and artifacts in the world offering insight into eighteenth- and nineteenth-century English and American religious and cultural history.

Special Collections at Drew University cover a wide range of materials from the 11th century to the present. Topics include religious materials such as hymnbooks, prayer books, and Bibles, as well as non-religious materials such as witchcraft, literature, graphic novels, and science fiction magazines. Most notably, the collection holds a first edition of the King James Bible.

The library's special collections include a collection of books, manuscripts, artifacts and papers of Nebraska-born author Willa Cather (1873–1947). This collection, which is regarded as the best collection of Cather's papers assembled in the United States, was given to the university by several donors, including Frederick B. Adams, former director of the Pierpont Morgan Library; Earl and Achsah Brewster, longtime friends of Cather; violinist Yehudi Menuhin; and by Finn and Barbara Caspersen.

Athletics 
Originally known as "The Circuit Riders" in honor of their Methodist origins, Drew's sports teams are known as the Rangers and compete in the NCAA's Division III. The Rangers field 20 teams (11 female, 9 male) in 12 varsity sports. Drew is a member of the Landmark Conference for men's and women's basketball, cross country, golf, lacrosse, soccer, swimming & diving, tennis, baseball, field hockey and softball. The Rangers compete as an independent in men's and women's fencing, which compete in the Mid-Atlantic Collegiate Fencing Association (MACFA), the National Intercollegiate Women's Fencing Association (NIWFA) and the Eastern Women's Fencing Conference (EWFC), and co-ed equestrian, which competes in the Intercollegiate Horse Show Association (IHSA). Drew offers many club teams including ultimate frisbee and Drew's women's and men's rugby teams, which are part of the collegiate division of the Metropolitan New York Rugby Football Union. Drew has several intramural sports programs.

Notable people 

In the university's 146-year history, Drew's faculty and alumni have taken leading roles in the ministry and missions of the United Methodist Church and other Christian denominations, in spiritual instruction, in academia, in public service, and in the professional world.
Drew's faculty, starting with John McClintock and James Strong—especially with his magnum opus, Strong's Concordance—to recent faculty members including philosopher Robert S. Corrington, the founder of "ecstatic naturalism"; ethics professor Thomas C. Oden, the founder of paleo-orthodoxy, and Leonard Sweet, a leader in the emerging church movement, have continued to impact Christian theology and spiritual scholarship. Other faculty have included lexicographer Robert L. Chapman, editor of the fourth and fifth editions of Roget's Thesaurus; Ira Progoff, a psychotherapist, developed the Intensive Journal Method, and researcher of depth psychology; and Irish history scholar Christine Kinealy. William Campbell, research fellow in Drew's RISE institute, was awarded the 2015 Nobel Prize in Physiology or Medicine.

According to the UMC, Drew's seminary now has more than 3,500 alumni and alumnae "in 45 states and 18 foreign countries, including 21 bishops of The United Methodist Church." Among these alumni: Henry G. Appenzeller (BD 1885) was the first Methodist missionary to Korea and fostered a relationship between Korea, the church, and Drew that endures to this day;, Peter Deunov (1892), Bulgarian philosopher and spiritual teacher, and Olive Winchester (Th.D. 1925), a Church of the Nazarene theologian, was the first female ordained minister in Great Britain. Frederick Brown Harris (1912) was twice the Chaplain of the United States Senate.

Alumni include popular historian and journalist John T. Cunningham (BA 1938); Craig Stanford (BA 1978), a biology and anthropology professor and director of the Jane Goodall Research Center at the University of Southern California; and Jeff Smith (M.Div. 1965), minister, cookbook author, host of The Frugal Gourmet a television program that aired from 1973 to 1997. Several Drew alumni have had careers in public service, including Nathaniel Raymond (BA 1999), human rights advocate involved in investigations into the Dasht-i-Leili massacre; Holly Bakke (BA 1973), an attorney who served as New Jersey Commissioner of Banking and Insurance (2002–2005); Peter Verniero (BA 1981), a former New Jersey Attorney General and New Jersey Supreme Court justice; and Thomas J. Aquilino (BA 1962), a federal judge on the United States Court of International Trade.

Gallery

See also 
 List of colleges and universities in New Jersey
 List of botanical gardens in the United States
 Lectionary 301

Notes

References 
 Citations

Further reading 
 Cunningham, John (2002). University in the Forest: The Story of Drew University (third edition). .

External links 

 
 Drew Athletics website
 

 
Arboreta in New Jersey
Botanical gardens in New Jersey
Educational institutions established in 1867
Universities and colleges in Morris County, New Jersey
Liberal arts colleges in New Jersey
1867 establishments in New Jersey
Madison, New Jersey
Universities and colleges affiliated with the Methodist Episcopal Church
Private universities and colleges in New Jersey